Stringfellow Glacier is a glacier just west of Henson Glacier, flowing north from the Detroit Plateau of Graham Land into Wright Ice Piedmont. Mapped from air photos by Hunting Aerosurveys (1953–57). Named by United Kingdom Antarctic Place-Names Committee (UK-APC) for John Stringfellow (1799–1883), English designer of the first powered model airplane to make a flight, in 1848.

Glaciers of Davis Coast